The 2019–20 KK Crvena zvezda season was the 75th season in the existence of the club. For the season it is referred to as KK Crvena zvezda mts for sponsorship reasons. The club played in the Adriatic League and the EuroLeague, which were canceled due to the COVID-19 pandemic. The season in the Basketball League of Serbia had no start due to the same reason.

Overview 
On 18 June 2019, the Finals MVP of the Adriatic League and the Serbian League guard Billy Baron extended contract for one more season. On June 24, guard Branko Lazić signed a three-year contract extension. On June 25, guard Filip Čović signed a two-year contract extension. On June 26, forward Boriša Simanić signed a two-year contract extension. On June 28, forward Mouhammad Faye signed a one-year contract extension. On July 2, forward Stratos Perperoglou signed a one-year contract extension. On July 6, guard Ognjen Dobrić signed a two-year contract extension. On 28 August, center Nikola Jovanović signed a new contract. Forward Faye was a member of the Senegal national team at the 2019 FIBA Basketball World Cup in China.

On July 14, center Ognjen Kuzmić was involved in serious traffic accident near Banja Luka, Bosnia and Herzegovina, in which he got life-threatening injuries. On July 25, Kuzmić was discharged from the hospital to home care.

The Zvezda entered season poorly, getting relegated from ABA Supercup in the first match, losing 2 out of 3 games in ABA and having the same score in EuroLeague. Head coach Milan Tomić resigned less than a month after the season kicked off, leaving assistant Andrija Gavrilović, who never held a head coach position before, as an interim solution. In his official head coaching debut on 24 October, Gavrilović led the Zvezda to a 73–65 loss to FC Barcelona. Gavrilović failed to make any notable progress, which added to the bad atmosphere around the club. Gavrilović finished his stint as the interim head coach with a 5–6 record on 23 November. Upset by his poor performances, the Zvezda fans started booing Filip Čović. Club management reacted at the end of December, hiring Dragan Šakota as a head coach and reinforcing squad with center Vladimir Štimac and guard Kevin Punter. Forward Derrick Brown and Faye agreed with the club to terminate their contracts in January. By mid-February the Zvezda loaned Čović and Kuzmić to FMP, bringing in guard Kalin Lucas instead.

Season canceled  

On 12 March 2020, ABA League Assembly temporarily suspended the remainder of the 2019–20 season "until further notice" following the coronavirus pandemic. The club still remains to play one game until the end of the regular season and at least the semifinals of the 2020 playoffs. On 12 March 2020, Euroleague announced it was suspending its competitions due to the same reason. At that point, Zvezda held 3rd position in ABA with one round left to be played, and 14th position in Euroleague, with six rounds remaining. On 12 May, the team came back after the break and started with a training program. On 25 May, Euroleague canceled its 2019–20 season. The Zvezda will return to Euroleague for the next season. On 27 May 2020, the ABA League Assembly canceled definitely the 2019–20 season due to the COVID-19 pandemic. The Serbian SuperLeague season was suspended prior its start due to the COVID-19 pandemic. On 28 May, the Serbian League Assembly canceled definitely the 2019–20 season due to the COVID-19 pandemic.

Players

Squad information

Players with multiple nationalities
   Marko Jagodić-Kuridža
   Charles Jenkins
   Michael Ojo
   Kevin Punter

Depth chart

On loan

Transactions

Players In

|}

Players Out

|}
Notes:
 1 On loan during the 2018–19 season.

Club

Technical Staff 
On 2 October, Crvena zvezda named Žarko Čabarkapa as a new sports director. On 22 October, head coach Milan Tomić resigned from his post. Assistant coach Andrija Gavrilović was named as the interim head coach. Afterwards, Serbian-Greek Dragan Šakota was named as the new head coach on 23 November.

Source: Crvena zvezda Staff

Uniform
The following is a list of corporate sponsorship patches on a uniform of Crvena zvezda and uniform designs for the 2019–20 season. 

Crvena zvezda debuted their new uniforms for the 2019–20 season after unveiling their new uniforms on 22 September 2019.

Supplier: Nike
Main sponsor: mts
Back sponsor: Idea (top), Komercijalna banka (bottom)
Shorts sponsor: None

Pre-season games 
The Zvezda roster played six exhibition games and went undefeated.

Competitions

Overall

Overview

Adriatic League

Regular season

Results summary

Results by round

Matches
All times are local UTC+1.

EuroLeague

Regular season

Results summary

Results by round

Matches

Serbian Super League

The 2019–20 Basketball League of Serbia was the 14th season of the Serbian highest professional basketball league and the Super League, as the second part of the season. The Zvezda is the defending champions. The season was suspended prior to its start due to the COVID-19 pandemic. On 28 May, the Serbian League Assembly canceled definitely the 2019–20 season due to the COVID-19 pandemic.

Radivoj Korać Cup

The 2020 Radivoj Korać Cup is the 14th season of the Serbian cup tournament held within February 2020.

All times are local UTC+1.

In the semifinal game, American guard Billy Baron scored the 3-point buzzer-beater for a 80–79 win over Mega Bemax.

Adriatic Supercup

The 2019 Adriatic Supercup was the 3rd season of the Adriatic cup tournament held in September 2019 in Zagreb, Croatia. The Zvezda was the defending champions, but was eliminated in quarterfinals by Koper Primorska.

Individual awards

Adriatic League 
MVP of the Round

Source: ABA League

Statistics

Adriatic League

EuroLeague

Radivoj Korać Cup

ABA Super Cup

Head coaches records 

Updated:

See also 
 2019–20 Red Star Belgrade season
 2019–20 KK Partizan season
 2019–20 KK Cedevita Olimpija season

References

External links
 KK Crvena zvezda official website
 Crvena zvezda at the Adriatic League 
 Crvena zvezda at the EuroLeague

KK Crvena Zvezda seasons
Crvena zvezda
Crvena zvezda
Crvena zvezda